In the United Kingdom, state funerals are usually reserved for monarchs. The most recent was for Queen Elizabeth II on 19 September 2022.

A state funeral may also be held to honour a highly distinguished figure following the approval of the monarch and Parliament (of the expenditure of public funds). The last non-royal state funeral in the UK was that of Sir Winston Churchill, on 30 January 1965.

Other funerals, including those of senior members of the British royal family and high-ranking public figures, may share many of the characteristics of a state funeral without being categorised as such; for these, the term 'ceremonial funeral' is used. In the last fifty years, ceremonial funerals have been held for Louis Mountbatten, 1st Earl Mountbatten of Burma (1979); Diana, Princess of Wales (1997); Queen Elizabeth The Queen Mother (2002); Margaret Thatcher, Baroness Thatcher (2013); and His Royal Highness Prince Philip, Duke of Edinburgh (2021). Ceremonial funerals have tended in general to follow the ritual patterns of a state funeral (if on a somewhat smaller scale).

A gun carriage is used to transport the coffin between locations, accompanied by a procession of military bands and detachments along with mourners and other officials. There may also be a lying in state and other associated ceremonies.

Features of a state funeral

Overview
State funeral customs have evolved over time. For the funeral service itself the Book of Common Prayer has been used in recent centuries, with readings from the Authorized Version of the Bible; in its essentials the form of service used is the same for a monarch as for any other person. Besides the presence of national and international dignitaries in large numbers, much of the distinctive character of a state funeral is set by the processions surrounding the conveyance of the coffin from place to place, and by the lying-in-state which generally precedes the funeral (until the 21st century these were the only elements that could be seen by members of the public). In many respects the obsequies of Queen Victoria in 1901 set the tone for the modern state funeral, with her desire to be buried 'as a soldier's daughter' (the use of a gun carriage to transport the coffin, for example, dates from this time). The next three state funerals of a monarch (those of Edward VII in 1910, of King George V in 1936 and of King George VI in 1952) all conformed to a similar pattern, albeit with individual differences and modifications; (for example, the use of Westminster Hall for the lying-in-state dates from the time of the funeral of King Edward VII). Full ceremonial details of each funeral are recorded in the London Gazette (see 'External links' below).

State funeral of Queen Elizabeth II

The state funeral of Queen Elizabeth II in 2022 followed the same general pattern and conformed in many of the same details. A notable difference, however, was that the funeral service itself was separated from the committal service (with the former taking place in Westminster Abbey and the latter at St George's Chapel, Windsor). Another distinguishing feature was occasioned by the fact that Queen Elizabeth had died at Balmoral in Scotland, which allowed an additional procession, service and Lying-in-State to be held in Edinburgh, prior to the coffin being brought to London.

For the first time, in 2022, the monarch's funeral service in Westminster Abbey was televised, as was the committal service in St George's Chapel.

The events in London and Windsor took place as follows:

 Conveyance of the body to Westminster Hall. From Buckingham Palace the Queen's coffin was transported to Westminster on a horse-drawn gun carriage of the King's Troop, Royal Horse Artillery, escorted by military contingents, preceded by members of the late Queen's Household and followed on foot by the King and other members of the Royal Family. The coffin was draped with the Royal Standard, and on it was placed the Imperial State Crown and a wreath of flowers. The late monarch's current and former equerries served as pallbearers, walking alongside the coffin; while the 'bearer party' (which carried the coffin when required) was made up of eight guardsmen, accompanied by two officers. 
 Lying in state in Westminster Hall. The coffin was placed on a catafalque in the middle of the hall. Following a brief service, the Orb and Sceptre were placed on the coffin, in addition to the Crown and flowers. Members of the public were then admitted and, over the course of four days and nights, filed past the coffin to pay their respects. During the lying in state each corner of the catafalque was guarded by units of the Sovereign's Bodyguard and the Household Division. 
 Conveyance of the body from Westminster Hall to Westminster Abbey. For this procession the State Gun Carriage was hauled by 138 sailors of the Royal Navy. The coffin was escorted by the sovereign's bodyguards: the Gentlemen at Arms, the Yeomen of the Guard and the Royal Company of Archers.
 State Funeral Service in Westminster Abbey. The service was attended by the King and seventy other members of the wider royal family, along with Heads of State and other overseas representatives, those representing the Realms, the Commonwealth, Government, Parliament, the devolved Parliaments and Assemblies, the Church, charities and recipients of state honours. The service was conducted by the Dean of Westminster and a sermon was preached by the Archbishop of Canterbury, who also pronounced the Commendatory prayer. The lessons were read by the Commonwealth Secretary-General and the Prime Minister of the United Kingdom. 
 Conveyance of the body from Westminster Abbey to Windsor Castle. A large procession accompanied the monarch's body for the first part of its final journey to Windsor (from the Abbey to Hyde Park Corner), including Armed Forces detachments from the UK and the Commonwealth realms. At Wellington Arch the coffin was transferred to the State Hearse and travelled by road to Windsor. For the last part of the journey, through Windsor Great Park, the procession was reassembled and accompanied the hearse to Windsor Castle, where it was joined again by members of the Royal Family. 
Committal service in St George's Chapel, Windsor Castle. The service was conducted by the Dean of Windsor, with the Archbishop of Canterbury giving the final Blessing. Alongside the King and members of the Royal Family, the congregation was made up of past and present members of the Queen's Household along with the Governors General and Prime Ministers of the Commonwealth Realms. Prior to the lowering of the coffin into the royal vault, the Crown, Orb and Sceptre were removed from the coffin and placed on the altar; the new King placed the Queen's Company Camp Colour on the coffin, and following a centuries-old precedent, the Lord Chamberlain (the head of the late Queen's Household) broke his white staff of office to symbolize the end of his period of service to the late monarch. The Garter King of Arms then pronounced the style of the deceased monarch, using a form of words that has varied little over centuries of use. 
 Burial in the King George VI Memorial Chapel: this took place privately later on the day of the funeral, with the immediate family only in attendance.

Other state funerals
State funerals of distinguished citizens have followed a similar pattern to those of the monarch, except for the location of the funeral and burial. Churchill's body was taken by gun carriage from Westminster Hall (where it had lain in state) to St Paul's Cathedral for the funeral, which was said at that time to have been the largest in world history, bringing together representatives from 112 nations. Afterwards, his body was taken by river (on board the Port of London Authority launch Havengore) to Waterloo for the railway journey to Bladon for burial. His pallbearers were political and military leaders with whom he had worked closely during the war: Clement Attlee, Anthony Eden, Harold Macmillan, Lord Ismay, Lord Slim, Lord Portal, Lord Alexander and Lord Mountbatten.

History

Location
From 1820, up to and including the funeral of King George VI in 1952, funerals of monarchs were held in St George's Chapel, Windsor Castle, with the burial also taking place there (or, in the case of Queen Victoria, in the nearby Frogmore Mausoleum). In earlier centuries, Westminster Abbey was the usual venue for both funeral and burial (albeit with several exceptions: for instance, Henry VIII was buried at Windsor, whilst James II and George I were both buried overseas). The funeral of Queen Elizabeth II was also held in Westminster Abbey; it was followed on the same day by a committal service in St George's Chapel, Windsor. The burial took place privately that same evening (attended by immediate family only) in the adjacent King George VI Memorial Chapel. 

The funeral of Admiral Nelson in 1806 set the precedent for St Paul's Cathedral being used as a grand venue for funerals of distinguished subjects. The State Funerals of Wellington and Churchill also took place there, as, more recently, did the ceremonial funeral of Baroness Thatcher. In the past half century, royal ceremonial funerals have tended to be held in Westminster Abbey (e.g. those of Lord Mountbatten, Diana, Princess of Wales and Queen Elizabeth the Queen Mother) with the burial in each case taking place privately elsewhere; however, the royal ceremonial funeral of Prince Philip (the consort of Elizabeth II) took place in St George's Chapel, Windsor, in unusual circumstances: because of the covid restrictions in place at that time, which permitted a maximum of only 30 mourners to be in attendance, the ceremonial was greatly pared down.

Allowing the body of a monarch or nobleman to lie in state (for the public to pay their respects) is a long-established custom dating back many centuries, and is analogous to the once widespread practice of laying out a corpse for mourners at their home prior to a funeral. The use of Westminster Hall for this purpose, though, is comparatively modern, having begun with the state funeral of William Gladstone in 1898 (until 1882 the hall had been in use as law courts, and would not have been available for state events at short notice). The first monarch to lie in state there was Edward VII in 1910, and the first consort Queen Mary (1953). Monarchs in the 19th century all lay in state in Windsor Castle. In the 18th century Kensington Palace was often used, while in the 17th century the Palace of Whitehall was generally preferred. In earlier times, entry to the lying in state had been restricted to the gentry and nobility, but following the death of King George III in 1820 the public at large were admitted to the lying in state at Windsor Castle (where around 30,000 people filed past the late king's coffin in the two days before his funeral); this set the pattern for subsequent monarchs (with the exception of Queen Victoria, who had stipulated that her body should not lie in state).

Beforehand, the body will often have lain in a private room or chapel elsewhere (e.g. At the place of death) for private viewing. Both George V and George VI died at Sandringham and their bodies lay in the church there for a time, watched over by estate workers and gamekeepers; whereas the body of Edward VII lay in the throne room in Buckingham Palace. Elizabeth II died at Balmoral Castle; her body lay in the ballroom there for two days, allowing estate workers and family members to pay their respects, before being transported to Edinburgh, where it lay overnight in the Throne Room at Holyrood House prior to a public lying in state in St Giles' Cathedral. It then lay overnight in the Bow Room at Buckingham Palace, before being taken in procession to Westminster Hall for the public lying in state.

Rites and ceremonies

Pre-1700: Heraldic funerals

Tudor and Jacobean State funerals had a strongly heraldic flavour (this in fact had been a distinguishing feature of both royal and noble funerals since the Late Middle Ages). The Exchequer customarily provided all those taking part in the procession (from 'poor men' and servants to nobles and royalty) with lengths of black cloth for their mourning garb. Noblemen in particular wore full-length black mourning cloaks, and hoods drawn down over their faces; while noblewomen (who played a key role in the funeral processions for a female monarch or consort) wore a long straight gown with a trained surcoat, coupled with a white wimple-like head covering. The quality and amount of material in these garments was strictly regulated by the College of Arms, according to the rank of the wearer: thus, a seventeenth-century Duke was permitted 16 yards of fabric at 10s a yard, a Knight only 5 yards at 6s.8d. 

As well as the mourners, the horses were dressed all in black, and it was customary for black drapes to be hung along the route of the procession. Color was provided by the heralds, who wore tabards over their mourning cloaks and carried the late monarch's achievements in the procession. Colorful heraldic banners were also carried at various points in the procession. The coffin was borne on a horse-drawn bier or 'chariot' and covered by a richly embroidered pall. Those of the highest rank in society were distinguished by having a canopy carried over their coffin, which remained held in place for the duration of the funeral service. 

From the fourteenth century onwards it became customary for a lifelike wooden effigy of the deceased person to be carried on or near the coffin in royal and noble funeral processions; previously, the embalmed body itself would probably have been on view. Surviving effigies, with contemporary clothing, are on display in Westminster Abbey; at the funeral of a monarch or queen consort the effigy was dressed in their coronation robes and regalia. The first king for whom a funeral effigy was made was Edward II in 1327, and the last effigy of a monarch to be carried in procession was that of James I at his funeral on 7 May 1625; since the funeral of his successor, Charles II, a crown on a cushion has instead been placed on the coffin.

Funerals were occasions for royal almsgiving, and a feature of medieval royal funerals was the contingent 'poor men' or 'alms men' who would walk in the procession offering prayers for the soul of the deceased. The prayers were suppressed at the Reformation, but poor men (and women) continued to receive charity and to take part in the procession. A contingent of 266 poor women walked at the head of the funeral procession for Elizabeth I, which made its way from Whitehall Palace to Westminster Abbey in 1603, and the Queen's High Almoner preached at the service. The procession, which numbered over a thousand participants in all, included peers and peeresses and their children on the one hand, marshalled according to rank, and a multitude of servants on the other, from the 'children of the scullery' and the 'yeomen of the boiling house' to the late Queen's sewers and the Maids of Honour of her Privy Chamber. The Great Officers of State were also in attendance, along with the chief justices, the Lord Mayor and Aldermen of London and numerous clerks and officials. The Master of the Horse led a Palfrey of Honour directly behind the coffin (a relic of a medieval tradition by which a late monarch's horse would follow them into church and be given as a perquisite to the Abbey); and then followed the chief mourner (who for Elizabeth I was the Marchioness of Northampton, premier noblewoman of England). At the back marched the Yeomen of the Guard. The chief officers of the late Queen's household carried their white staves of office in the procession; at the end of the funeral service (in accordance with tradition) they broke them across their knees and cast them into the grave as a sign that their duties were now at an end.

1700–1900: Heraldic tradition maintained

Many of the above funeral practices persisted well into the nineteenth century. At the funeral of William IV (the last monarch to die before Queen Victoria) the chief mourner and his attendants still wore black mourning cloaks, black drapes were hung along the route of the procession and a black canopy was borne over the coffin. The coffin itself was covered with a purple velvet pall, embroidered with the Royal arms. The crowns of the United Kingdom and of Hanover were carried on cushions in the procession, and placed on the coffin for the service, and behind the coffin heraldic banners were carried: the banner of the royal arms and banners of the Union, of England, Ireland and Scotland, and also of Hanover and Brunswick.

At this time, and indeed in previous centuries, the procession at a state funeral was very clearly a state procession: thus, as well as members of the late monarch's household, it usually included the peerage, the privy council, the judiciary and other state officeholders. When King William IV attended the funeral of his late brother George IV, the Sword of State and Cap of Maintenance were carried before him, as at the State Opening of Parliament. Until the 20th century, monarchs by custom did not attend the funerals of their predecessors; William IV was an exception: not only did he attend, but he published a personal message of thanks in the Gazette for all who had participated. It was also rare for women to be seen in attendance, though the women of Queen Anne's royal household did walk in her funeral procession in 1714.

These funerals took place after sunset. At the funeral of William IV, for example, the procession from the lying in state set off at 8 pm; the Brigade of Guards lined the processional route (as they still do today), and one in four of them held a burning torch. The regiments involved were accompanied by their regimental bands (according to the Gazette, each band in turn played the Dead March in Saul as the procession approached their position along the route). As today, those bearing arms (swords or rifles), whether lining the route or marching in the procession, carried or held them reversed as a sign of mourning.

A tradition of firing 'minute guns' during the funeral procession is one that has been followed for over 300 years. Indeed, in 1830 and 1837 the guns began at 4 a.m., and they continued firing: once every five minutes for the next seventeen hours, and then once every minute from 9 p.m. Until the end of the ceremony.

Non-royal state funerals in the 19th century were very similar to those for monarchs, even down to a herald reading the style and titles of the deceased, and leading members of their household carrying white staves and breaking them at the graveside. One striking exception, though, was the state funeral of William Gladstone, which took place entirely without military involvement. Instead, the members of the Lords and the Commons walked in procession, each led by their respective presiding officer.

The funeral of Queen Victoria: an innovative approach

The state funeral of Queen Victoria took place in February 1901; it had been 64 years since the last burial of a monarch. Victoria left strict instructions regarding the service and associated ceremonies and instituted a number of changes, several of which set a precedent for state (and indeed ceremonial) funerals that have taken place since. First, she disliked the preponderance of funereal black; henceforward, there would be no black cloaks, drapes or canopy, and Victoria requested a white pall for her coffin. Second, she expressed a desire to be buried as "a soldier's daughter". The procession, therefore, became much more a military procession, with the peers, privy counsellors and judiciary no longer taking part en masse. Her pallbearers were equerries rather than dukes (as had previously been customary), and for the first time, a gun carriage was employed to convey the monarch's coffin. Third, Victoria requested that there should be no public lying in state. This meant that the only event in London on this occasion was a gun carriage procession from one railway station to another: Victoria having died at Osborne House (on the Isle of Wight), her body was conveyed by boat and train to Waterloo Station, then by gun carriage to Paddington Station, and thence by train to Windsor for the funeral itself. On the train's arrival in Windsor the horses that were formed up at the station broke away from the gun carriage, necessitating the recruitment of a nearby contingent of sailors to pull the coffin.

The rare sight of a state funeral cortège travelling by ship provided a striking spectacle: Victoria's body was carried on board  from Cowes to Gosport, with a suite of yachts following conveying the new king, Edward VII, and other mourners. Minute guns were fired by the assembled fleet as the yacht passed by. Victoria's body remained on board ship overnight (with Royal Marines keeping vigil) before being conveyed by gun carriage to the railway station the following day for the train journey to London.

Since 1901: innovation becomes tradition

State funerals since have in many respects followed the template set by Queen Victoria, but with the public lying in state reinstated. (The use of Westminster Hall for this purpose immediately proved popular, with over a quarter of a million people taking the opportunity to file past the coffin in 1910; its use as the primary venue for lyings-in-state is now well-entrenched.) Even the unintended drawing of the hearse by a Royal Guard of sailors (from HMS Excellent) became tradition almost immediately when the royal coffin was further conveyed to the Royal Mausoleum at Frogmore two days later, at the command of King Edward, by means of the same naval detachment.

The use of Westminster Hall led to the establishment of another tradition: the practice of tolling Big Ben as the coffin left Westminster for Windsor on the day of the funeral, sounding as many strokes as there were years in the dead monarch's life. This was first done for King Edward VII, and repeated for George V, George VI and Elizabeth II.

The State procession for the funeral of Edward VII involved a very large number of foreign heads of state, together with royal and other representatives. Nine kings rode behind the coffin, and forty foreign princes; but pride of place behind the gun carriage was given to the late king's favourite fox terrier, Caesar (escorted by a highlander). Behind the dog walked the King Edward's charger, led riderless, with the late King's boots reversed in the stirrups. The main procession took two hours to get from Westminster Hall to Paddington station, where the mourners boarded the royal train, which took them (along with the King's body) to Windsor for the funeral. The same processional route was followed in 1936 and 1952, and on both occasions foreign kings and princes walked behind the coffin (albeit in diminishing numbers), accompanied by their suites and other foreign representatives; but this did not take place in 2022, when the funeral took place in Westminster Abbey.

One notable event at the lying-in-state of King George V was the so-called Vigil of the Princes: the four sons of the late king (King Edward VIII, the Duke of York, the Duke of Gloucester and the Duke of Kent) all stood guard together for a time. The vigil was recalled 66 years later at the lying-in-state of Queen Elizabeth The Queen Mother, with her grandsons the Prince of Wales, the Duke of York, the Earl of Wessex, and Viscount Linley taking post together. The four children of Elizabeth II stood guard at her lying in state twice: once in Edinburgh and once at Westminster; her eight grandchildren likewise stood vigil at her coffin during the lying in state in Westminster Hall.

An innovation following the death of Elizabeth II was the use of motor vehicles in the funeral processions. Throughout the 20th century, railway trains had been used to move the body of the deceased monarch to London and from there to Windsor; and at each location the coffin was transported using a gun carriage (and those accompanying it in procession, if not walking or riding, rode in horse-drawn carriages from the Royal Mews). In 2022, by contrast, an RAF aircraft took the Queen's body from Edinburgh to London, and a motor hearse was used for most of the journey to Windsor. Hearses had been used for private royal funerals since the 1930s, but this was the first time one had been used for a deceased monarch. Likewise, state cars were used in preference to carriages for the first time in the formal processions.

Entitlement
The honour of a state funeral is usually reserved for the sovereign as head of state. A few historical civilians of profound achievement, exceptional military leaders, and outstanding statesmen have also been honoured with a full state funeral, including, for example, Sir Isaac Newton, Viscount Nelson, the Duke of Wellington, William Ewart Gladstone and Sir Winston Churchill.  State funerals other than that of the monarch require an Act of Parliament to authorise the use of state funds to cover the cost of the funeral.

Many newspapers and individuals continue to speculate that the spouse of a monarch is entitled to a state funeral, however this is untrue and most spouses and widows of monarchs have received a Royal Ceremonial Funeral.

Distinguishing between a state funeral and a ceremonial funeral

Many of the features of a state funeral are shared by other types of funerals, and distinguishing between them is not easy. A ceremonial funeral, like a state funeral, often has a lying in state, a procession with a gun carriage and military contingents, and a funeral service attended by state representatives, both domestic and foreign. One clear distinction, however, is that state funerals (like coronations and the State Opening of Parliament) are organized and overseen by the Earl Marshal and his officers the Heralds, who are prominently placed ahead of the coffin in the procession. They are not so involved in royal ceremonial funerals, which are instead organized by the Lord Chamberlain. (The Lord Chamberlain is a Great Officer of the Household, whereas the Earl Marshal is a Great Officer of State).

The visual distinction usually referred to is that in a state funeral, the gun carriage bearing the coffin is drawn by sailors from the Royal Navy rather than horses. This distinguishing feature is not invariable, however, as shown by the use of naval ratings rather than horses at the ceremonial funeral for Lord Mountbatten in 1979 (one of a number of features on that occasion which emphasized Mountbatten's lifelong links with the Royal Navy).

Another distinction made between a state funeral and a ceremonial funeral is that a state funeral for a distinguished subject requires a message from the Sovereign to each of the Houses of Parliament, under the royal sign manual, informing them of the funeral and inviting their attendance. In the case of the state funeral for a deceased Sovereign, a message from the Earl Marshal, acting at the new Sovereign's command, informs the Houses of Parliament of the arrangements for the funeral and requires their attendance at the lying-in-state. Ceremonial funerals do not require such formal invitation of the Houses of Parliament by the Sovereign. Ceremonial funerals on the death of a member of the Royal Family are preceded by the approval of a motion in each House of Parliament directing that an address of condolence be presented on behalf of the House to the Sovereign. But such addresses are usual for the deaths of all members of the Royal Family, and are therefore moved even for deceased members of the Royal Family who will have private funerals. In the case of a state funeral for a distinguished subject, the parliamentary address takes a different format, because it is moved in reply to the Sovereign's message informing Parliament of the decision to hold a state funeral, and in this case the address thanks the monarch for the decision to hold a state funeral and for all arrangements made, and expresses Parliament's participation in the national grief. In the case of a state funeral for a deceased Sovereign, the new monarch writes a message to each House of Parliament a few days after his accession (and after the delivery to Parliament of the Earl Marshal's message regarding practical arrangements for the funeral), mentioning the demise of the late Sovereign and expressing his sentiments for the new reign, and both Houses of Parliament then reply with addresses expressing condolence for the death of the late monarch and assuring the new Sovereign of their allegiance.

List of state, royal and ceremonial funerals

Members of the Royal Family

State funerals

Ceremonial funerals

Private funerals since 1910

a  The former King Edward VIII had opted for a private royal funeral, rather than a full state funeral, with the exception that Garter King of Arms recited words reserved for the deceased sovereign – a feature of a state funeral.

Outside the Royal Family

State funerals
Several other notable people and former prime ministers have been awarded a full state funeral:
(Some of the following may not have been state funerals in the strictest sense of the term, even though some sources refer to them as such.)

Ceremonial funerals

Offers of state funerals

1881: Upon his death, the estate of Benjamin Disraeli was offered a state funeral by William Ewart Gladstone, Prime Minister at the time. In his will Disraeli had made it clear that he did not want a state funeral and that he wanted to be buried in St Michael and All Angels Church, Hughenden next to his wife. There was later a memorial service in Westminster Abbey.
1910: The famous nurse and statistician Florence Nightingale was offered a state funeral, but her family opted for a private ceremony. 
2013: There was some speculation at the time of her death that Margaret Thatcher would be accorded a state funeral, but the government announced that she would not receive a state funeral "in accordance with her own wishes". Instead, she was accorded a ceremonial funeral with full military honours at St Paul's Cathedral, as authorised by Queen Elizabeth II.

Devolved administrations
There is no formalised process or convention for how the devolved administrations in Scotland, Wales, or Northern Ireland commemorate important figures. The deaths of Ian Paisley and Martin McGuinness were privately commemorated, reflecting political and religious sensitivities in Northern Ireland. In Scotland, there have not yet been any funerals organised by the state in the modern era. In 2017, the Welsh Government organised a humanist funeral for former First Minister Rhodri Morgan at the National Assembly for Wales, which was televised and billed as a major national event.

See also
 Funeral directors to the Royal Household

References

Further reading 
 Gittings, Clare, Death, Burial and the Individual in Early Modern England, first publ. 1984 by Croom Helm, reprint (London: Routledge, 1988).
 Range, Matthias, British Royal and State Funerals. Music and Ceremonial since Elizabeth I (Woodbridge: Boydell, 2016).
 Woodward, Jennifer, The Theatre of Death: The Ritual Management of Royal Funerals in Renaissance England, 1570-1625 (Woodbridge: Boydell, 1997).
 Wolffe, John, Great Deaths. Grieving, Religion, and Nationhood in Victorian and Edwardian Britain (Oxford University Press, 2000).

External links
 A site devoted to British military ceremonial, including State Funerals

For the past 300 years, detailed official reports of the events surrounding state funerals have been published in the London Gazette:
 Funeral of Charles II (1685): 
 Funeral of Queen Anne (1714): 
 (The funeral of George I took place in Hanover.)
 Funeral of Sir Isaac Newton (1727): 
 Funeral of George II (1760): 
 Funeral of the Viscount Nelson (1804): 
 Funeral of George III (1820):
 Funeral of George IV (1830): 
 Funeral of William IV (1837): 
 Funeral of the Duke of Wellington (1852): 
 Funeral of William Ewart Gladstone (1898): 
 Funeral of Queen Victoria (1901): 
 Funeral of Edward VII (1910): 
 Funeral of George V (1936): 
 Funeral of George VI (1952): 

Since the late 19th century state funerals have been filmed and they are now viewable online:
 Footage of the funeral of William Gladstone (1898)
 Footage of the funeral of Queen Victoria (1901)
 Footage of the funeral of Edward VII (1910)
 Footage of the funeral of George V (1936)
 Footage of the funeral of George VI (1952)
 Footage of the funeral of Winston Churchill (1965)
 Footage of the funeral of Elizabeth II (2022)

 
Ceremonies in the United Kingdom
British monarchy
Funerals in the United Kingdom